The 2014 Montana Grizzlies football team represented the University of Montana in the 2014 NCAA Division I FCS football season. The Grizzlies were led by head coach Mick Delaney in his third and final year and played their home games on campus at Washington–Grizzly Stadium. Montana participated as a member of the Big Sky Conference, of which they are a charter member.  They finished the season 9–5, 6–2 in Big Sky play to finish tied for second place. They received an at-large bid to the FCS Playoffs where they lost in the second round to inter conference rival Eastern Washington.

On November 17, head coach Mick Delaney announced he would be retiring at the end of the season. He finished at Montana with a three-year record of 24–14.

Schedule

Source: Official Schedule
 *- Cowles Montana Media Broadcasting is the former Max Media. ABC or FOX stations in Missoula, Kalispell, Butte, Bozeman, Great Falls, and Helena; the Bilins NBC affiliate, and a mix of SWX and KULR in Billings will air the games.

Game summaries

@ Wyoming

Central Washington

South Dakota

@ North Dakota State

Northern Colorado

@ North Dakota

UC Davis

@ Cal Poly

Sacramento State

@ Eastern Washington

@ Southern Utah

Montana State

FCS Playoffs

First Round–San Diego

Second Round–@ Eastern Washington

Ranking movements

References

Montana
Montana Grizzlies football seasons
Montana
Montana Grizzlies football